Qazaza was a Palestinian village in the Ramle Subdistrict of Mandatory Palestine, located  south of Ramla. It was depopulated in 1948.

History
In 1838,  in the Ottoman era,   el Kuzazeh  was noted as  Muslim village, in the  Er-Ramleh district.

A European traveler reported that he passed Qazaza in the 1860s on his way to examine a nearby tell.

Socin found from an official Ottoman village list from about 1870  that  Kezaze had a population of 133, in 89 houses,  though the population count included men only. It was also noted that it was located  two hours southeast of Shahma. Hartmann found that  Kezaze  had 85  houses.

In 1882, the PEF's Survey of Western Palestine (SWP)  described   Kerazeh  as "a small village of adobe and stone at the edge of the hills, with gardens and a well."

British Mandate era
In the 1922 census of Palestine, conducted by the British Mandate authorities, Qezazeh  had a population of 472 Muslims,  increasing in the 1931 census to 649, still all Muslims, in a total of 150 residential houses.

The villagers  maintained a village mosque and some owned shops. An elementary school was first established in Qazaza in 1922. In 1945 Qazaza joined with the villagers of Sajad and Jilya and established a common school for all the three villages. This school had 127 students at the time of its founding in 1945.

The villagers cultivated grain, vegetables and fruits.

In  the 1945 statistics   the population was 940, all Muslims,  while the total land area was 18,829  dunams, according to an official land and population survey. Of this, a total of 11,757 dunums were allocated to cereals, while 131 dunums were irrigated or used for orchards, while 38 dunams were classified as built-up urban areas.

1948 war and aftermath
During the countdown to the 1948 Arab–Israeli War, the Haganah was ordered to demolish Arab houses in so-called "retaliatory measures". In this connection, Haganah units partially destroyed the home of the mukhtar of Qazaza, Abdullah Abu Sabah, on the 19 December 1947, in response to the killing of a Jew. Two Arabs were killed during this operation.

On 16 July 1948, Givati HQ informed General Staff\Operations that "our forces have entered the villages of Qazaza, Kheima, Jilya, Idnibba, Mughallis, expelled the inhabitants, [and] blown up and torched a number of houses. The area is at the moment clear of Arabs".

Many of Qazaza's former inhabitants fled to Hebron, forming part of the 1948 Palestinian exodus.

Today, the village lands are used by the Israel Defense Forces. As a closed military zone, it is not known what became of Qazaza's mosque, its elementary school (which had served the villages of Sajad and Jilya as well) or its more than 150 homes.

See also
 Depopulated Palestinian locations in Israel
 Palestine Railways
 Jaffa–Jerusalem railway

References

Bibliography

 
 
 

 
Mansell, A. L. (1863): "A Surveying Trip through the Holy Land." The Nautical Magazine and Naval Chronicle. January Issue:36-40. Cited in Khalidi, 1992.

External links
Welcome to Qazaza
Qazaza, Zochrot
Survey of Western Palestine, Map 16:   IAA, Wikimedia commons  
Qazaza at Khalil Sakakini Cultural Center

District of Ramla
Arab villages depopulated during the 1948 Arab–Israeli War